The 2018 Arizona Superintendent of Public Instruction election took place on November 6, 2018, to elect the Arizona Superintendent of Public Instruction, concurrently with the election of Arizona's Class I U.S. Senate seat, as well as other elections to the United States Senate in other states and elections to the United States House of Representatives and various state and local elections.

Republican primary

Candidates

Nominee

Eliminated in primary
Tracy Livingston, board member of the Maricopa County Community College District
Robert Branch, Grand Canyon University professor
Jonathan Gelbart, charter school director
Diane Douglas, incumbent superintendent

Endorsements

Results

Democratic primary

Candidates

Nominee
Kathy Hoffman, speech-language pathologist at Peoria Unified School District

Eliminated in primary
David Schapira, former state senator (2011–2013)

Results

General election

Polling

Results

Notes

References

External links
Official Superintendent of Public Instruction campaign websites
Kathy Hoffman (D) for Superintendent
Frank Riggs (R) for Superintendent

Superintendent of Public Instruction
Arizona
Arizona Superintendent of Public Instruction elections